The Mzansi Account is a low income transactional banking account that was developed in line with the commitments of South Africa's Financial Sector Charter. The Financial Sector Charter requires banks to make banking more accessible to the nation and, specifically, to increase banking reach to all communities.

The Mzansi Account is the result of the major South African banks working collectively to provide a standard for new bank accounts, which is affordable, readily available and suits the specific needs of the previously unbanked communities. Each bank has established its own pricing competitively.

The collaboration between the banks has allowed Mzansi account holders to make use of any of the participating banks’ ATMs at no additional cost – effectively creating a network of over ten thousand ATMs across the country and extending the banking platform to the greater community. This is augmented by point of sale functionality available at retailers.

The Mzansi Account is issued by the following South African banks:
 Absa Group Limited
 FNB 
 Nedcor
 Standard Bank
 Postbank

By August 2006 3.3 million Mzansi Accounts had been opened across the 5 issuing banks.

References 

 "Mzansi will put Full Service Banking with 15km of the Vast Majority of South Africans", Banking Association Media Release, 15 October 2004. Accessed July 2007.
 "3,3m Mzansi accounts in 18 months", South Africa - The Good News, 30 August 2006. Accessed October 2007.

External links
Banking Association South Africa website
Financial Sector Charter Council website

Banking in South Africa